Henry Mounfield "Bo" Westlake (25 May 1927 – 13 January 2019) was a Canadian rower who competed in the 1952 Summer Olympics.

References

1927 births
2019 deaths
Canadian male rowers
Olympic rowers of Canada
Rowers at the 1952 Summer Olympics